Calathus lundbladi is a species of ground beetle from the Platyninae subfamily that is endemic to the Azores.

References

lundbladi
Beetles described in 1938
Endemic arthropods of the Azores
Beetles of Europe